Zhenghua Park is a nature park in Singapore bounded by Bukit Timah Expressway (BKE), BKE Slip Road to Kranji Expressway (KJE), and Dairy Farm Road.

History
The park was built between the PUB pipeline reserve and the Bukit Timah Expressway (BKE), near the Bukit Panjang housing estate.

Visitor Info
The 13.5 ha park provides a number of activities for its visitors; including cycling, hiking and has other facilities such as the playground and fitness equipment.

The park hosts over twenty species of tree including rubber trees.

See also
List of Parks in Singapore
National Parks Board

References

External links
National Parks Board, Singapore

Parks in Singapore